Georges Lacombe (18 June 1868 – 29 June 1916) was a French sculptor and painter.

Early life
Born to a distinguished family of Versailles, he received his artistic training at the Académie Julian from the impressionists Alfred Philippe Roll and Henri Gervex.

The Nabis
At the Académie Julian he met Émile Bernard and Paul Sérusier in 1892, shortly afterwards becoming a member of their artist group, Les Nabis.

Like many other Nabi he spent the summers from 1888 to 1897 in Brittany, some sources record that he met Bernard and Sérusier there. He became Le Nabi sculpteur: the sculptor of the group. In fact many sources refer to him solely as sculptor.

Death
Georges Lacombe died in Alençon, Orne on 29 June 1916, eleven days after his 48th birthday.

References and sources
References

Sources
 Frèches-Thory, Claire, & Perucchi-Petry, Ursula, ed.: Die Nabis: Propheten der Moderne, Kunsthaus Zürich & Grand Palais, Paris & Prestel, Munich 1993.

External links
 

1868 births
1916 deaths
19th-century French painters
French male painters
20th-century French painters
20th-century French male artists
Post-impressionist sculptors
20th-century French sculptors
19th-century French sculptors
French male sculptors
Académie Julian alumni
19th-century French male artists
Les Nabis